Advocacy for Teacher Empowerment Through Action, Cooperation and Harmony Towards Educational Reforms, Inc, also known as A Teacher Partylist, is a party-list in the Philippines. In the May 14, 2007 election, the party won one seat in the nationwide party-list vote (and has subsequently has seen been given another seat due to the litigation in the BANAT vs. COMELEC case).

Electoral performance

References

Party-lists represented in the House of Representatives of the Philippines